Sariska Tiger Reserve is a tiger reserve in Alwar district, Rajasthan, India. It stretches over an area of  comprising scrub-thorn arid forests, dry deciduous forests, grasslands, and rocky hills. This area was a hunting preserve of the Alwar state and was declared a wildlife sanctuary in 1958. It was given the status of a tiger reserve making it a part of India's Project Tiger in 1978. It is the first reserve in the world with successfully relocated tigers. It is an important biodiversity area in the Northern Aravalli leopard and wildlife corridor.

It is a part of the Aravalli Range and the Khathiar-Gir dry deciduous forests ecoregion. It is rich in mineral resources, such as copper. In spite of the Supreme Court's 1991 ban on mining in the area, marble mining continues to threaten the environment.

General information

Area: 
Elevation:  between 
Forest types:  tropical, dry, deciduous, and tropical thorn

Flora
The dominant tree in the forests is dhok (Anogeissus pendula). Other trees include the salar (Boswellia serrata), kadaya (Sterculia urens), dhak (Butea monosperma), gol (Lannea coromandelica), ber (Ziziphus mauritiana) and khair (Acacia catechu). Bargad (Ficus benghalensis), arjun (Terminalia arjuna), gugal (Commiphora wightii) or bamboo. Shrubs are numerous, such as kair (Capparis decidua), adusta (Adhatoda vesica) and jhar ber (Ziziphus nummularia).

Wildlife
Apart from the Bengal tiger, the reserve harbours many wildlife species including Indian leopard, jungle cat, caracal, striped hyena, golden jackal, chital, sambar deer, nilgai, wild boar, small Indian civet, Javan mongoose, ruddy mongoose, honey badger, Rhesus macaque and Northern plains gray langur and Indian hare.
Bird species present include grey partridge, white-throated kingfisher, Indian peafowl,  bush quail, sandgrouse, treepie, golden-backed woodpecker, crested serpent eagle and the Indian eagle-owl.

In 2003, 16 tigers lived in the reserve. In 2004, it was reported that no tigers were sighted in the reserve, and that no indirect evidence of tiger presence was found such as pug marks, scratch marks on trees, scats. The Rajasthan Forest Department explained that "the tigers had temporarily migrated outside the reserve and would be back after monsoon season". Project Tiger staff backed this assumption. In January 2005, it was reported that there were no tigers left in Sariska.

In July 2008, two tigers from Ranthambhore National Park were relocated to Sariska Tiger Reserve. Another female tiger was relocated in February 2009.

In 2012, two tiger cubs and their mother were spotted in the reserve bringing the total number of tigers to seven with five adults. In July 2014, two more cubs were spotted, so that there were 11 tigers in total.

As of October 2018, there were 18 tigers including five cubs. By 2020, the tiger population in the reserve has risen to 20.

Relocation efforts

In 2005, the Government of Rajasthan, in cooperation with the Government of India and Wildlife Institute of India, planned the re-introduction of tigers to Sariska and also the relocation of villages. Plans to construct a bypass were also discussed. It was decided to import one male and two females from Ranthambore National Park. The Wildlife Institute of India along with the Government of Rajasthan started tracking the relocated tigers with the help of ISRO's reconnaissance satellites. The first aerial translocation of the male tiger from Ranthambhore to Sariska was carried out on 28 June 2008 by helicopter.

Only two of the four villages' experts were actually moved, though the second, Kankwari, was shifted long after the tigers were re-introduced. However, Kankwari fort has been renovated by the state tourism department, which can possibly violate wildlife protection norms. The first relocated village was Bhagani. Also, the diversion of roads crossing the reserve, an issue critical to the survival of its wildlife, continues to be a problem.

One more tigress was shifted to Sariska from Ranthambhore in February 2009. On 28 July 2010, another tigress was brought from Ranthambhore National Park. Totaling five tigers — two males and three females — were living in the reserve until November 2010 when the first relocated tiger died due to poisoning.

Unfortunately, the first three of the relocated tigers came from one father. Moreover, the first two tigresses have the same mother.

Places of interest

Kankwadi Fort- A 16th-century fort, originally built by Jai Singh II, located near the centre of the park.
Temple of Neelkanth
Pandupol Hanumanji Temple - Located in the hills in the centre of the reserve is believed to be one of the retreats of the Pandava. This pilgrimage site causes problems for wildlife, due to heavy traffic.
Sariska Palace - Was used as a royal hunting lodge of Maharaja, was associated with the kings of Alwar.
Viratnagar - Some ruins of a Buddhist monastery on a hillock called Bijak ki Pahadi that dates back to 3rd century BC.

See also
 Leopards of Haryana
 Arid Forest Research Institute
 Indian Council of Forestry Research and Education

References

Further reading
 Dang, H. (2005). Sariska National Park. Indus Publishing Company, New Delhi. 
 Ziddi, S. (1998). A guide to the wildlife parks of Rajasthan. Photo-Eye Publications, Jaipur.

External links

 "Sariska Tiger Reserve". Wildlife Protection Society of India. Retrieved 31 December 2017.

Khathiar-Gir dry deciduous forests
National parks in Rajasthan
Protected areas established in 1955
Tiger reserves of India
Tourist attractions in Alwar district
Wildlife sanctuaries in Rajasthan
1955 establishments in Rajasthan